Ctibor Reiskup (14 April 1929 – 2 February 1963) was a Slovak rower. He competed at the 1956 European Rowing Championships in Bled, Yugoslavia, with the men's eight where they won the gold medal. The same team went to the 1956 Summer Olympics in Melbourne with the men's eight where they were eliminated in the semi-final. He died on 2 February 1963 in Roháče (region of Western Tatras), aged 33.

References

1929 births
1963 deaths
Czechoslovak male rowers
Olympic rowers of Czechoslovakia
Rowers at the 1956 Summer Olympics
People from Liptovský Mikuláš District
Sportspeople from the Žilina Region
European Rowing Championships medalists